The Samuel Josiah Atkinson House (also known as Hogan Creek Farm) is a historic house and farm located at 586 Atkinson Road in Siloam, Surry County, North Carolina.

Description and history 
The farmhouse was built in 1893, and is a two-story, three bay, Late Victorian frame I-house. The property also includes the contributing well house/smokehouse, wood shed, privy, tobacco pack house, corn crib, feed barn, two tobacco barns, and the Johnny Jones House (c. 1830), which was moved to the site in 2009.

It was listed on the National Register of Historic Places on April 16, 2012.

References 

Houses on the National Register of Historic Places in North Carolina
Farms on the National Register of Historic Places in North Carolina
Victorian architecture in North Carolina
Houses completed in 1893
Houses in Surry County, North Carolina
National Register of Historic Places in Surry County, North Carolina
I-houses in North Carolina